People's Republic of China Marriage Certificate is a legal document issued by the Chinese marriage registration authority to prove the valid establishment of a marriage relationship. There are two official marriage certificates, one for each man and woman.

Look 
The format of the marriage certificate is uniformly formulated by the Civil Affairs Bureau.The marriage certificate must be affixed with a photo of both men and women, and stamped with a special stamp for marriage registration.After the founding of China, marriage certificates became smaller.About the size of a palm.The content is only the name, place of origin, signature, age and signature of witnesses of the person who registered the marriage.No other decorative patterns.The cover color of the certificate is purplish red.

History 

In the early years, the textures of marriage books were rice paper, hard books, silk noodles, and rough edged paper, and most of them were handwritten.The first year of the Republic of China began to use ink printing, and the words were gorgeous and beautiful.

Before 1980 
Chinese marriage certificates have a long history, but the marriage certificates of various dynasties in history were privately made by the people.    According to records, the earliest official marriage certificate in China appeared in the Qing Dynasty.It's called "LongFengTie".Seven to 10 days after the engagement, both parties go to the local government to collect the marriage certificate and pay taxes as required.Later, during the Taiping Heavenly Kingdom period, there was a marriage certificate called "Hehui"(合挥), which was similar to the Qing Dynasty.During the period of the Republic of China, the marriage certificate was issued by the local government, and the content and form were also different.

After the founding of the People's Republic of China, the Marriage Law of the People's Republic of China was implemented on May 1, 1950.Among them, Article 6 stipulates:"Both parties to the marriage should go to the local (district, township) people's government to register in person. For marriages that comply with the provisions of this law, the local people's government shall immediately issue a marriage certificate.Any marriage not in conformity with the provisions of this law shall not be registered."After the divorce, if both the man and the woman voluntarily restore the marital relationship, they should register with the district people's government for restoration of marriage.The district people's government shall register and issue a resumed marriage certificate.

Approved by the State Council of the People's Republic of China on May 20, 1955, on June 1, 1955, the Ministry of Internal Affairs of the People's Republic of China promulgated the "Marriage Registration Measures", which stipulated in detail the specific methods of marriage registration.It stipulates:

After the promulgation of the "Marriage Registration Measures" in 1955, marriage certificates have always been printed by the county and city governments, so there is no uniform standard for the form and specification of marriage certificates, and most of them are in the form of certificates of merit.Marriage certificates in the 1950s ranged from larger ones to as small as two palms.From the 1950s to the 1970s, the decorative patterns on marriage certificates included traditional auspicious patterns such as mandarin ducks playing in the water and plum blossoms, as well as new patterns such as rice ears, cotton, and doves of peace.Slogans are often printed on marriage certificates, such as "voluntary" in the 1950s, "diligence and thrift, family planning" in the 1970s and 1980s, and so on.During the Cultural Revolution, some marriage certificates were also printed with Chairman Mao's portrait, Chairman Mao's quotations and so on.After the reform and opening up, with the gradual improvement of China's legal system, the legal document nature of the marriage certificate has gradually strengthened, and the form of the marriage certificate has gradually transitioned from the certificate type to the passport type.

From 1980 to 1986 

On November 11, 1980, the Ministry of Civil Affairs of the People's Republic of China officially abolished the "Marriage Registration Measures" promulgated by the Ministry of Internal Affairs on June 1, 1955, and issued and implemented the "Marriage Registration Measures" at the same time. The new "Marriage Registration Measures" stipulates:
The new "Marriage Registration Measures" changed the unified printing of marriage certificates by counties and cities to the unified printing by the people's governments of provinces, autonomous regions and municipalities directly under the Central Government, which improved the standardization of marriage certificates.

From 1986 to 1994 
On December 31, 1985, it was approved by the State Council of the People's Republic of China. On March 15, 1986, the Ministry of Civil Affairs of the People's Republic of China issued and implemented the "Marriage Registration Measures". The "Marriage Registration Measures" issued on November 11, 1980, were repealed at the same time.The new "Marriage Registration Measures" stipulates:

On May 10, 1986, the "Letter of the General Office of the Ministry of Civil Affairs on Making and Issuing the "Marriage Certificate" and Other Uniform Patterns" was issued, which stated that "According to the "Marriage Registration Measures" approved by the State Council on December 31, 1985 "" Article 11, on the basis of soliciting the opinions of the civil affairs departments (bureaus) and relevant departments of all provinces, autonomous regions, and municipalities directly under the Central Government, our ministry has designed and formulated the "Marriage Certificate", "Divorce Certificate", "Conjugal Relationship Certificate", The format of the "Certificate of Dissolution of Marriage".Also designed the "Marriage Registration Application", "Divorce Registration Application", "Application for Issuance of Marital Relationship Certificate" and "Application for Issuance of Marital Relationship Certificate". "Require all localities" to arrange printing according to the requirements of the attached "Explanation on Style". "In order to avoid waste, the "Marriage Certificate", "Divorce Certificate", "Marriage Registration Application" and "Divorce Registration Application" originally used in various places can continue to be used, and new certificates will be replaced after they are used up. The time for the replacement of the new certificate shall be determined by the province, autonomous region or municipality directly under the Central Government according to the actual situation, and shall be reported to the Civil Affairs Department of the Ministry of Civil Affairs for the record. "

Therefore, since 1986, the Ministry of Civil Affairs of the People's Republic of China has formulated the format of the marriage certificate, and each province, autonomous region, and municipality directly under the Central Government has printed it separately.

From 1994 to 2003 

Approved by the State Council on January 12, 1994, issued by the Ministry of Civil Affairs Order No. 1 on February 1, 1994 and implemented the "Regulations on the Administration of Marriage Registration", approved by the State Council on December 31, 1985, and promulgated by the Ministry of Civil Affairs on March 15, 1986, The "Marriage Registration Measures" shall be repealed at the same time. The "Regulations on the Administration of Marriage Registration" stipulates that:

In 1994, the People's Republic of China began to print a unified marriage certificate, which was supervised by the Ministry of Civil Affairs of the People's Republic of China and stamped with the "Special Seal for the Administration of Marriage Certificates of the Ministry of Civil Affairs of the People's Republic of China". The marriage certificate is similar in shape to a passport, with gold letters on a red background.

Since 2003 

On July 30, 2003, the State Council executive meeting passed, and on August 8, 2003, the State Council Order No. 387 promulgated the "Regulations on Marriage Registration", which came into force on October 1, 2003. The "Regulations on the Administration of Marriage Registration" approved by the State Council on January 12, 1994, and issued by the Ministry of Civil Affairs on February 1, 1994, shall be repealed at the same time. The Marriage Registration Ordinance states:

On July 1, 2004, the People's Republic of China launched a new version of the marriage certificate.The covers of the new version of the marriage certificate and divorce certificate are all jujube red, which changed the situation that the cover of the marriage certificate was red and the cover of the divorce certificate was green since 1994. The cover of the marriage certificate is gilded, and the cover of the divorce certificate is gilded.Both certificates are supervised by the Ministry of Civil Affairs of the People's Republic of China.In order to facilitate computer printing, the old version of vertical layout has been changed to horizontal layout.The inner core of the card uses the national flower peony as the shading, and adopts the special technology of printing money, which greatly improves the anti-counterfeiting performance. The new certificate has a unified logo and a unified color, but only a small hot color treatment, which does not highlight the difference between the two.

After 2004, the Ministry of Civil Affairs of the People's Republic of China started to promote the networking of marriage registration systems across the country. In early 2010, pilot marriage registration networking was started in Sichuan and Shaanxi provinces.In June 2010, Shandong Province uniformly used the new version of the marriage certificate and upgraded the marriage registration system throughout the province, in preparation for the marriage registration network in Shandong Province in September of the same year.The new version of the marriage certificate number is composed of the area code of the registered party, the year, and the ranking serial number.In addition, the new marriage registration number stipulates that starting with 'J' for marriage, starting with 'L' for divorce, starting with 'BJ' for re-issued marriage certificate, and starting with 'BL' for re-issue of divorce certificate.The last six digits of the letter are the area code, the middle four digits are the year, and the last six digits are the ranking number.

On September 28, 2018, the electronic marriage certificate function was launched in version 2.0 of the "Jiangsu Government Affairs" applet in cooperation with Alipay.

On August 6, 2019, Alipay announced that five provinces and cities in Fujian, Jiangxi, Jiangsu, Zhejiang, and Chongqing have launched electronic marriage certificates.

Pick up requirements 
Statutory conditions for obtaining a marriage certificate: Both parties are voluntary, have no spouse, the male is over 22 years old and the female is over 20 years old, both parties are not lineal blood relatives, not collateral blood relatives within the third generation, and there is no disease that medically believes should not be married.

my country's "Marriage Law" advocates the freedom of marriage. It stands to reason that everyone has the right to marry. In fact, this is not the case. According to our country's laws and regulations, at least the following types of people are not eligible for marriage:

Process 
Both men and women comply with the provisions of the Marriage Law, and the procedures for obtaining a marriage certificate can be divided into three steps: application, review and registration:

(1) Application. Both men and women who want to get married must hold their household registration certificate, resident ID card, and a signed statement that they have no spouse and no direct blood relatives or collateral blood relatives within three generations of the other party. Apply for marriage registration at the marriage registration office where one party's household registration is located. Both men and women must be present when applying for registration. If you are divorced, you should also hold a divorce certificate. In the place where prenuptial examination is carried out, the certificate of prenuptial examination from the hospital should also be held.

(2) Review. The registration authority may, when necessary, require the parties to provide relevant certification materials, conduct necessary investigations, or designate items for medical identification when examining the marriage applications of both parties.

(3) Registration. After examination, the marriage registration authority shall approve the registration and issue a marriage certificate if it considers that the marriage conditions are met. If the marriage registration authority refuses to register, it shall issue a written statement explaining the reasons for the refusal.

References 

Marriage in Chinese culture
Marriage law
Identity documents